Venezuelan Revolution may refer to:
The Venezuelan War of Independence (1810–1823)
The Federal War (1859–1863)
The Bolivarian Revolution (1999–present)
The 2014–18 Venezuelan protests